Gerard "Gerrit" Leendertszoon Blasius (1627–1682) was a Dutch physician and anatomist. He was born in Amsterdam and was the eldest son of Leonard Blasius (died 1644), who had worked as an architect in Copenhagen. Gerard started his studies there, but the family moved to Leiden, after his father died. Around 1655, he became a physician in Amsterdam. In October 1659, Blasius was appointed at the Athenaeum Illustre but without being paid. In the next year, he became the first Amsterdam professor in medicine. At his home or in the hospital, corpses were dissected. In 1661, he claimed the discovery of Stensen's duct by his pupil Nicolas Stensen.

Blasius had married Cornelia van Ottinga in 1653.
His younger brother was the poet Joan Blasius

Blasius died in Amsterdam in 1682.

Works
A list of works:
 Disputatio physica de principatu cordis, etc Praes Albertus Kyper (1655)
 Impetus Jacobi Primerosii doctoris medici, in Vop. Fort. Plempium ... retusus / a Gerardo Leon. Blasio (1659)
 Commentaria, in syntagma anatomicum ... Joann. Veslingii / Ger. Leon. Blasius
 Oratio inauguralis de iis quae homo naturae, quae arti, debeat. / Gerardus Leon. Blasius
Anatome contracta (1660)
 Medicina generalis nova accurataque methodo fundamenta exhibens / Gerardus Leonardi Blasius (1661)
 Pest-geneesing en bewaaring voor dezelve. (1663)
 Observata anatomica in homine, simia, equo variisque animalibus aliis Accedunt extraordinaria in homine reperta praxin medicam aeque ac anatomen illustrantia n (1664)
 Medicina universa; hygieines et therapeutices fundamenta methodo nova brevissimè exhibens (1665) Gerardi Blasii, ab Oost-vliet ...
 Anatome medullae spinalis, et nervorum inde provenientium (1666)
 Anatome contracta, in gratiam discipulorum conscripta, & edita (1666)
 Observationes anatomicae selectiores collegii privati Amstelodamensis, figuris aliquot illustr
 Observationes anatomicae selectiores amstelodamensium 1667, 1671
 Institutionum medicarum compendium, disputationibus XII ... absolutum / Gerardus Leon. Blasius
 Miscellanea anatomica, hominis, brutorumque variorum, fabricam diversam magnâ parte exhibentia (1673) Gerardi Blasii med. doct. & prof.
  Observata anatomica in homine, simiâ, equo, vitulo, ove, testudine, echino, glire, serpente, ardeâ, Gerardi Blasii ab Oost-Vliet ... variisque animalibus aliis. : Accedunt extraordinaria in homine reperta, praxin medicinam æque ac anatomen illustrantia (1674)
 Ontleeding des menschelyken lichaems / beschreeven en in verscheydene figuren afgebeelt door Geerard Blasius (1675) 
 Observationes medicae anatomicae rariores (1677)
 Observationes medicae rariores in quibus multa ad anatomiam et medicinam spectantia deteguntur
 Zootomiae, seu Anatomes variorum animalium pars prima (1676)
 Medicina curatoria methodo nova in gratiam discipulorum conscripta (1680)
 Anatome animalium, terrestrium variorum, volatilium, aquatilium, serpentum, insectorum, ovorumque, structuram naturalem ... figuris variis illustrata (1681)

References

Sources
 Miert, D. van (2005) Illuster onderwijs. Het Amsterdamse Athenaeum in de Gouden Eeuw, 1632-1704, p. 73-75
 Gerardi Blasii Amstelodamensis Observationes medicae rariores. Accedit Monstri triplicis historia 

1627 births
1682 deaths
Academic staff of the University of Amsterdam
17th-century Dutch physicians
Dutch anatomists
17th-century Dutch anatomists
Scientists from Amsterdam